Dermatopolymyositis  is a family of myositis disorders that includes polymyositis and dermatomyositis. As such, it includes both a distinctive skin rash and progressive muscular weakness.  It is a rare disease.

References

External links 

Inflammations
Systemic connective tissue disorders